Diarmuid Carey (born 28 September 2000) is an Irish cricketer. He made his Twenty20 debut for Munster Reds in the 2018 Inter-Provincial Trophy on 25 May 2018 against North West Warriors. He did not feature for Munster in the 2019 season, but did go onto play a further two Twenty20 matches against Leinster Lightning in the 2020 Inter-Provincial Trophy.

References

External links
 

2000 births
Living people
Irish cricketers
Munster Reds cricketers
Sportspeople from Cork (city)